The Argus 411 was a twelve-cylinder, air-cooled, inverted-V12 aircraft engine developed by Argus Motoren in Germany during World War II.

Design and development

The As 411 was a refined and more powerful version of the Argus As 410. Most 411 production was undertaken by Renault in occupied Paris, these engines were used to power the Siebel Si 204 and the post war Dassault MD 315 Flamant. It developed 600 PS (592 hp, 441 kW) at 3,300 rpm

Following the end of World War II, Renault continued to manufacture the engine as the Renault 12S. After merging the French aircraft engine manufacturers into SNECMA in 1945, production continued under the new designation SNECMA 12S.

Variants

As 411 A refined and more powerful version of the Argus As 410.
Renault 12S Production of the As 411 after World War II in France.
SNECMA 12S (a.k.a. SNECMA Renault 12S) Designation change on the formation of SNECMA.
SNECMA 12T (a.k.a. SNECMA Renault 12T) Refined version of the 12S with new pistons, cylinders and revised induction system.
SNECMA 12T-303Dassault propeller
SNECMA 12T-312Ratier propeller

Applications
Arado Ar 96 
Breguet 892 Mercure  (4 × 12S)
Dassault MD 315 Flamant
Focke-Wulf Fw 189
Fouga CM.100
Pilatus P-2
Siebel Si 204
SNCAC NC.2001
Sud Ouest S.O.93

Specifications (SNECMA 12S)

See also

References

Further reading

 

Argus aircraft engines
Aircraft air-cooled V piston engines
1940s aircraft piston engines
Inverted V12 aircraft engines